Knights of Pythias Building, Knights of Pythias Lodge, Pythias Lodge Building, Knights of Pythias Lodge Hall, or Knights of Pythias Temple may refer to:

James M. Amoss Building, also known as the Knights of Pythias Building, Wabash, Indiana
 Knights of Pythias Building (Phoenix, Arizona) 
Pythias Lodge Building (San Diego, California)
Knights of Pythias Lodge Hall (Weiser, Idaho)
Knights of Pythias Building and Theatre, Greensburg, Indiana
Knights of Pythias Lodge (South Bend, Indiana)
Knights of Pythias Temple (Louisville, Kentucky)
 Pythian Opera House, Boothbay Harbor, Maine
 Pythian Temple (New York City)
 Knights of Pythias Building (Virginia City, Nevada)
 Pythian Temple and James Pythian Theater, Columbus, Ohio
Knights of Pythias Pavilion, Franklin, Tennessee
 Knights of Pythias Temple (Dallas, Texas)
 Knights of Pythias Building (Fort Worth, Texas)
 Pythian Castle (Portsmouth, Virginia)
 Pythian Temple (Tacoma, Washington)

See also
List of Knights of Pythias buildings
Pythian Castle (disambiguation)
Pythian Temple (disambiguation)